Morrisound Recording (also Morrisound Studios) is an audio recording facility in Tampa, Florida, United States, owned and operated by brothers Jim and Tom Morris. Since its opening in 1981, Morrisound has been responsible for the popularization of death metal, but caters to other genres.

Notable albums recorded at Morrisound include works by bands such as Steve Morse, Sepultura, Savatage, Morbid Angel, Death, Control Denied, Napalm Death, Obituary, Incubus, Cannibal Corpse, Deicide, Iced Earth, Six Feet Under, End-Time Illusion, Trans-Siberian Orchestra, Atheist, Kamelot, Seven Mary Three and Demons and Wizards.

Selected albums recorded

Agent Steel - Unstoppable Force (1987)
Atrocity - Hallucinations (1990)
Atheist - Piece of Time (1990)
Atheist - Unquestionable Presence (1991)
Brooke Hogan - About Us ft. Paul Wall (2006)
Cancer - Death Shall Rise (1991)
Cannibal Corpse - Eaten Back to Life (1990)
Cannibal Corpse - Butchered at Birth (1991)
Cannibal Corpse - Tomb of the Mutilated (1992)
Cannibal Corpse - The Bleeding (1994)
Cannibal Corpse - Vile (1996)
Cannibal Corpse - Gallery of Suicide (1998)
Control Denied - The Fragile Art of Existence (1999)
Crimson Glory - Transcendence (1988)
Cynic - Focus (1993)
Death - Leprosy (1988)
Death - Spiritual Healing (1990)
Death - Human (1991)
Death - Individual Thought Patterns (1993)
Death - Symbolic (1995)
Death - The Sound of Perseverance (1998)
Deicide - Sacrificial demo
Deicide - Deicide (1990)
Deicide - Legion (1992)
Deicide - Once upon the Cross (1995)
Deicide - Serpents of the Light (1997)
Deicide - In Torment in Hell (2001)
Demolition Hammer - Tortured Existence (1991)
Demons & Wizards - Demons and Wizards (2000)
Demons & Wizards - Touched by the Crimson King (2005)
Doctor Butcher - Doctor Butcher (1994)
Exhorder - Slaughter in the Vatican (1990)
Iced Earth - Iced Earth (1990)
Iced Earth - Night of the Stormrider (1991)
Iced Earth - Burnt Offerings (1995)
Iced Earth - The Dark Saga (1996)
Iced Earth - Days of Purgatory (1997)
Iced Earth - Something Wicked This Way Comes (1998)
Iced Earth - The Glorious Burden (2004)
Iced Earth - Dystopia (2011)
Kamelot - Eternity (1995)
Kamelot - Dominion (1997)
Kamelot - Siége Perilous (1998)
Kreator - Renewal (1992)
Master - Master (1990)
Morbid Angel - Altars of Madness (1989)
Morbid Angel - Blessed Are the Sick (1991)
Morbid Angel - Covenant (1993)
Morbid Angel - Formulas Fatal to the Flesh (1998)
Napalm Death - Harmony Corruption (1990)
Nocturnus - The Key (1990)
Nocturnus - Thresholds (1992)
Obituary - Slowly We Rot (1989)
Obituary - Cause of Death (1990)
Obituary - The End Complete (1992)
Obituary - World Demise (1994)
Savatage - Sirens (1983)
Savatage - Edge of Thorns (1993)
Savatage - Handful of Rain (1994)
Seven Mary Three - American Standard (1995)
Seven Mary Three - Orange Ave. (1998)
Seven Mary Three - The Economy of Sound (2001)
Sepultura - Arise (1991)
Saigon Kick - Water (1993)
Saigon Kick - Devil in the Details (1995)
Six Feet Under - Haunted (1995)
Six Feet Under - Bringer of Blood (2003)
Six Feet Under - Death Rituals (2008)
Steve Morse - The Introduction (1984)
Toxik - World Circus (1987)
Warrant - Dog Eat Dog (1992)

References

External links 
 Official website

Recording studios in the United States
Hillsborough County, Florida
Culture of Tampa, Florida
1981 establishments in Florida